Carboot Soul is the third studio album by Nightmares on Wax. It was released in 1999 on Warp. It peaked at number 71 on the UK Albums Chart. Early copies of the album were issued with a designer packet of Rizla cigarette papers, which featured the album's artwork.

Critical reception

John Bush of AllMusic gave the album 4.5 stars out of 5, calling it "one of the best arguments yet for the continuing development of trip-hop beyond mere coffee table fare."

Track listing

Charts

References

External links
 

1999 albums
Nightmares on Wax albums
Warp (record label) albums